Sebastian A. "Subby" Anzaldo (August 3, 1933 – August 7, 2019) was a booking agent and Mayor of Omaha, Nebraska.

Career 
Anzaldo served as acting mayor, following the resignation of his predecessor P.J. Morgan, from September 20, 1994 to January 9, 1995.

Anzaldo, a theatrical booking agent by profession, had also served from 1988 on the Omaha City Council for district 3.

References

Mayors of Omaha, Nebraska
Nebraska Democrats
2019 deaths
Omaha City Council members
1933 births
Place of birth missing